Xenotyphlops grandidieri is a species of blind snake endemic to Madagascar. No subspecies are currently recognized.

Taxonomy
In addition to having no subspecies, X. grandidieri is the only species in the genus Xenotyphlops, which is the only genus in the family Xenotyphlopidae. Therefore, X. grandidieri is a monotypic species in a monotypic genus in a monotypic family.

Etymology
The specific name, grandidieri, is in honor of French naturalist Alfred Grandidier.

Geographic range
Xenotyphlops grandidieri is found in northern Madagascar.

For over 100 years X. grandidieri was known only from the type specimens and the vague type locality "Madagascar".

References

Further reading
Mocquard F (1905). "Note préliminaire sur une collection de Reptiles et de Batraciens offerte au Muséum par M. Maurice de Rothschild ". Bulletin du Muséum National d'Histoire Naturelle 11 (5): 285–288. ("Typhlops Grandidieri ", new species, p. 287). (in French).
Wegener JE, Swoboda S, Hawlitschek O, Franzen M, Wallach V, Vences M, Nagy ZT, Hedges SB, Köhler J, Glaw F (2013). "Morphological variation and taxonomic reassessment of the endemic Malagasy blind snake family Xenotyphlopidae (Serpentes, Scolecophidia)". Spixiana 36 (2): 269–282.
Wallach V, Ineich I (1996). "Redescription of a rare Malagasy blind snake, Typhlops grandidieri Mocquard, with placement in a new genus (Serpentes: Typhlopidae)". Journal of Herpetology 30 (3): 367–376. (Xenotyphlops, new genus; Xenotyphlops grandidieri, new combination).

External links

Endemic fauna of Madagascar
Reptiles of Madagascar
Snakes of Africa
Critically endangered fauna of Africa
Reptiles described in 1905
Scolecophidia